The "Clean" Machine is an album by saxophonist Eddie "Cleanhead" Vinson which was recorded and released by the Muse label in 1978.

Reception

The AllMusic review by Scott Yanow stated "What makes this album different from many of Eddie "Cleanhead" Vinson's is that four of the seven selections are taken as instrumentals. Vinson's alto playing has long been underrated due to his popularity as a blues singer, so this release gives one the opportunity to hear his bop-influenced solos at greater length. With the assistance of a strong rhythm section ... Vinson is in excellent form throughout this enjoyable set".

Track listing
All compositions by Eddie Vinson except where noted
 "The Clean Machine" – 5:32
 "Taxi Driver Blues" (Leonard Feather) – 5:04
 "Corn Fed" – 6:38
 "When My Baby Left Me" – 4:54
 "Old Maid Boogie" – 3:01
 "Tenderly" (Walter Gross, Jack Lawrence) – 4:35
 "Non-alcoholic" – 4:42

Personnel
Eddie "Cleanhead" Vinson – alto saxophone, vocals
Jerry Rusch – trumpet
Rashid Ali – tenor saxophone
Gary Bell – guitar
Lloyd Glenn – piano
Larry Gales – bass
Bruno Carr  – drums

References

Muse Records albums
Eddie Vinson albums
1978 albums